Brookfield may refer to:

Australia 
Brookfield, Queensland, a suburb of Brisbane
Brookfield, Victoria

Canada 
Brookfield, Manitoba, on Manitoba Highway 11
Brookfield, Newfoundland and Labrador
Brookfield, Nova Scotia
Brookfield, Ontario, a neighbourhood of Sault Ste. Marie, Ontario
Brookfield, Prince Edward Island

New Zealand 
Brookfield, New Zealand, a suburb of Otumoetai in Tauranga, Bay of Plenty
Brookfield, Wellington, a Scouts Aotearoa camp site which has hosted the New Zealand Rover moot

United Kingdom 
Brookfield, Derbyshire, a location in Derbyshire, England
Brookfield, Preston, in Lancashire, England
Brookfield, Middlesbrough, a location in Middlesbrough, England
Brookfield, Renfrewshire, Scotland
 Brookfield, a neighbourhood of Robroyston, Glasgow, Scotland
Brookfield, County Fermanagh, a townland in County Fermanagh, Northern Ireland

United States 
Brookfield, Colorado, a place in Baca County, Colorado
Brookfield, Connecticut
Brookfield Center, Connecticut
Brookfield Center Historic District (Brookfield, Connecticut)
Brookfield, Delaware, a place in Kent County, Delaware
Brookfield, Georgia
Brookfield, Illinois
Brookfield Zoo, in Brookfield, Illinois
Brookfield, Indiana
Brookfield, Massachusetts
Brookfield (CDP), Massachusetts
Brookfield, Missouri
Brookfield, New Hampshire
Brookfield, New York
Brookfield (hamlet), New York
Brookfield, Chester County, Pennsylvania, a place in Pennsylvania
Brookfield, Tioga County, Pennsylvania, a place in Pennsylvania
Brookfield, Vermont
Brookfield (plantation) of Virginia, a former plantation and fixture of Gabriel's Rebellion of 1800
Brookfield, Wisconsin, a city
Brookfield (town), Wisconsin
Brookfield Place (New York City)
Brookfield Township (disambiguation)

Companies 
Brookfield Asset Management
Brookfield Properties
Brookfield Engineering, a manufacturer of viscometers
Brookfield Glass Company

Other uses 
 "Brookfield" (song), a song by Silverstein from the 2012 album Short Songs
 A British school in the 1934 James Hilton novella Good-bye, Mr. Chips
 A farm featured prominently in the British radio soap opera The Archers
 Brookfield (surname), list of people with the surname

See also 
Brookfield Community School (disambiguation)
Brookfield High School (disambiguation)
Brookfield Place (disambiguation)
Brookfield railway station (disambiguation)